County Wicklow was a constituency represented in the Irish House of Commons until 1800.

Members of Parliament
1585: Sir Henry Harrington and Edward Brabazon, later 1st Baron Ardee
1613–1614: Phelim MacFeagh Byrne and Gerald Byrne
1634–1635: Sir Robert Talbot, 2nd Baronet and __ Byrne 
1639–1649: Sir William Parsons and Sir William Ussher
1661–1666: Folliott Wingfield and Abraham Yarner (replaced by Edward Brabazon in 1666)

1689–1801

References

Constituencies of the Parliament of Ireland (pre-1801)
Historic constituencies in County Wicklow
1800 disestablishments in Ireland
Constituencies disestablished in 1800